Arhopala tomokoae is a butterfly of the family Lycaenidae. Panchala paraganesa tomokoae H. Hayashi, 1976 was moved to Arhopala paraganesa tomokoae by Schröder and Treadaway in 1955 and its status changed to Arhopala tomokoae by Schrőder and Treadaway in 2002.

It is endemic to Palawan island in the Philippines. Forewing length is 13–15 mm.

References
 Hayashi, Hisakazu., 1976: "New Subspecies of Cyaniriodes libna, Poritia erycinoides and Panchala paraganesa from Palawan (Lepidoptera: Lycaenidae)". Tyo-to-Ga. 27(2): 49–51.
 Treadaway, Colin G., 1955: "Checklist of the butterflies of the Philippine Islands". Nachrichten des Entomologischen Vereins Apollo, Suppl. 14: 7–118.
 Schröder, Heinz G. & Treadaway, Colin G., 2002: "Zur Kenntnis Philippinischer Lycaenidae", 15. Nachrichten des Entomologischen Vereins Apollo, N.F. 22: 239–241.
 Treadaway, Colin G. & Schrőder, Heinz G., 2012: "Revised checklist of the butterflies of the Philippine Islands (Lepidoptera: Rhopalocera)". Nachrichten des Entomologischen Vereins Apollo, Suppl. 20: 1-64.

Arhopala
Lepidoptera of the Philippines
Butterflies described in 1984